Palladius of Antioch (died 390), also known as Saint Palladius the Desert Dweller and Palladius the Hermit, was an Orthodox and Catholic saint in the Roman Empire. Palladius was a hermit in the desert near Antioch (modern Turkey). He was a friend of Saint Simeon. Palladius died  in 390 of natural causes and was canonized in pre-Congregation times.

Saint Palladius the Desert Dweller led an ascetic life in a mountain cave near Syrian Antioch. Because of his struggles, he is said to have received the gift wonder-working from the Lord. Once, a merchant was found murdered by robbers near his cave. People accused St Palladius of the murder, but through the prayer of the saint, the dead man rose up and named his murderers. The saint died at the end of the fourth century, leaving behind several works.

Saint Palladius is commemorated in the Orthodox Church and Eastern Catholic Churches on January 28.

See also

Christian monasticism
Stylites

Notes

References
Orthodox Church in America. Venerable Palladius the Hermit, of Antioch

Ancient Roman Catholic saints
309 deaths
Hermits in the Roman Empire
People from Antioch
4th-century Christian saints
Year of birth unknown